Events in 1981 in animation.

Events

February
 February 13: Ralph Bakshi's American Pop is first released.

March
 March 31: 53rd Academy Awards: Ferenc Rofusz' The Fly wins the Academy Award for Best Animated Short.

April
 April 3: The first episode of Willo the Wisp is broadcast.
 April 8: The first episode of Dr. Slump - Arale-chan, an adaptation of the Dr. Slump manga by Akira Toriyama, is broadcast.

July
 July 10: Ted Berman, Richard Rich and Art Stevens' The Fox and the Hound, produced by the Walt Disney Company, is first released.

August
 August 7: Gerald Potterton's Heavy Metal premieres and becomes a cult classic.

September
 September 12: The first episode of The Smurfs, produced by Hanna-Barbera, based on Belgian comics artist Peyo's eponymous comic series, is broadcast.
 September 16: The first episode of Postman Pat is broadcast.
 September 28: The first episode of Danger Mouse is broadcast.

October
 October 14: The first episode of Urusei Yatsura is broadcast.

December
 December 25: Stig Lasseby and Jan Gissberg's Peter-No-Tail is first released.

Specific date unknown
 The first Disney on Ice shows are organized.

Films released

 January 1 - The Mystery of the Third Planet (Soviet Union)
 January 3: 
 The Call of the Wild: Howl, Buck (Japan)
 Kaitei Daisensō: Ai no 20,000 Miles (Japan)
 January 5 - 3000 Leagues in Search of Mother (South Korea)
 February 7 - Run Melos! (Japan)
 February 13 - American Pop (United States)
 March 14:
 Doraemon: The Record of Nobita, Spaceblazer (Japan)
 The Fantastic Adventures of Unico (Japan)
 Kaibutsu-kun: Kaibutsu Land e no Shoutai (Japan)
 Mobile Suit Gundam I (Japan)
 Swan Lake (Japan)
 March 20 - Natsu e no Tobira (Japan)
 April 11: 
 Chie the Brat (Japan)
 Furiten-kun (Japan)
 April 26 - The Donbee Story (Japan)
 May 5: 
 Helen Keller Monogatari: Ai to Hikari no Tenshi (Japan)
 Lupin tai Holmes (Japan)
 June 8 - Sugata Sanshiro (Japan)
 June 23 - Around the World with Dot (Australia)
 July 4 - Tomorrow's Joe 2 (Japan)
 July 9: 
 Blizkata Dalechina (Bulgaria)
 Grendel Grendel Grendel (Australia)
 July 10 - The Fox and the Hound (United States)
 July 11 - Mobile Suit Gundam II: Soldiers of Sorrow (Japan)
 July 16 - Old Master Q (Hong Kong)
 July 18: 
 Captain (Japan)
 Sonyeon 007 Jihajeguk (South Korea)
 The Sea Prince and the Fire Child (Japan)
 July 21 - Enchanted Journey (Japan)
 July 22 - Gugugui taeyang seongung isunsin (South Korea)
 July 27 - Frankenstein (Japan)
 August 1: 
 21 Emon: Uchū e Irasshai! (Japan)
 Adieu Galaxy Express 999 (Japan)
 August 7:
 Gongnyong Baengmannyeon Ttori (South Korea)
 Heavy Metal (Canada)
 August 9: 
 Robot King (South Korea)
 Yuki (Japan)
 August 16 - Anime-ban Toukaidou Yotsuya Kaidan (Japan)
 August 23: 
 Bremen 4: Angels in Hell (Japan)
 Kabo-Encho no Dobutsuen Nikki (Japan)
 October 3 - Bokura Mangaka: Tokiwa-sou Monogatari (Japan)
 October 7 - Rennyo and His Mother (Japan)
 October 22 - Son of the White Mare (Hungary)
 November 20 - The Looney Looney Looney Bugs Bunny Movie (United States)
 November 28: 
 Manga Hana no Kakarichō (Japan)
 Manzai Taikouki (Japan)
 December 10 - The Little Fox (Hungary)
 December 20 - Minoïe (France)
 December 21 - Maria, Mirabela (Romania and Soviet Union)
 December 22 - Chiisana Love Letter: Mariko to Nemunoki no Kodomo-tachi (Japan)
 December 25 - Peter-No-Tail (Sweden)
 December 26 - Shunmao Monogatari Taotao (Japan)
 December 29 - Space Warrior Baldios (Japan)
 Specific date unknown - Renshenguo (China)

Television series

 January 4 - The Swiss Family Robinson: Flone of the Mysterious Island debuts on Fuji TV.
 January 31 - Saikyo Robo Daiohja debuts in syndication.
 February 7 - Yattodetaman debuts on Fuji TV.
 February 10 - Pigeon Street debuts on BBC.
 March 1 - Golden Warrior Gold Lightan debuts on Tokyo 12 TV.
 March 4 - Beast King GoLion debuts on Tokyo Channel 12.
 March 6 - Hello! Sandybell debuts on TV Asahi.
 March 7 - Ohayo Spank debuts in syndication.
 April 3 - Ai no Gakko Cuore Monogatari debuts on Mainichi Broadcasting System.
 April 7: 
 Belle and Sebastian debuts on NHK.
 Little Women debuts on Tokyo Channel 12.
 April 8 - Dr. Slump & Arale-chan debuts on Fuji TV.
 April 16 - Queen Millennia debuts on Fuji TV.
 April 20 - Tiger Mask II debuts on TV Asahi.
 July 3 - GoShogun debuts on Tokyo Channel 12.
 September 3 - Manga Mito Komo debuts on TV Tokyo.
 September 12: 
 Goldie Gold and Action Jack debuts on ABC.
 Astro and the Space Mutts, Space Stars, Spider-Man and His Amazing Friends, Teen Force, The Smurfs, and The Kid Super Power Hour with Shazam! debut on NBC.
 Blackstar, The Kwicky Koala Show, The New Adventures of Zorro, and Trollkins debut on CBS.
 Marmaduke and Spider-Man debut in syndication.
 September 14 - Willow the Wisp debuts on BBC1.
 September 16 - Postman Pat debuts on BBC1.
 September 28: 
 Danger Mouse debuts on ITV.
 Ninja Hattori-kun debuts on TV Asahi.
 October 1 - Superbook debuts on TV Tokyo, CBN, and Australian Christian Channel.
 October 2 - Six God Combination Godmars debuts on NNS (Nippon TV).
 October 3: 
 Chie the Brat debuts on MBS.
 Hero High debuts on NBC.
 October 4 - Dash Kappei debuts on Fuji TV.
 October 6 - Braiger debuts on TV Tokyo.
 October 7 - Honey Honey debuts on Fuji TV.
 October 8 - Miss Machiko debuts on TV Tokyo.
 October 9 - Dogtanian and the Three Muskehounds debuts on MBS and TVE.
 October 10:
 Laverne & Shirley in the Army debuts on ABC.
 Ulysses 31 debuts on FR3 and Nagoya Broadcasting Network.
 October 14 - Urusei Yatsura debuts on Fuji TV.
 October 23 - Fang of the Sun Dougram debuts on TV Tokyo.

Births

January
 January 1: Eden Riegel, American actress (voice of Yuna in Stitch!, Kiara in The Lion Guard, Boscha in The Owl House, young Miriam in The Prince of Egypt), and voice director (Disney Television Animation).
 January 15: Pitbull, American musician and businessman (voice of Bufo in Epic, Ugly Dog in UglyDolls).
 January 25: Alicia Keys, American singer, songwriter and actress (voice of Boinga's Mom in The Backyardigans episode "Mission to Mars", herself in The Proud Family episode "The Good, the Bad, and the Ugly").
 January 28: Elijah Wood, American actor (voice of Tom Thumb in The Adventures of Tom Thumb and Thumbelina, Mumble in Happy Feet and Happy Feet Two, 9 in 9, Sone in The Wind Rises, Beck in Tron: Uprising, Wirt in Over the Garden Wall, Jace Rucklin in Star Wars Resistance, himself in the Family Guy episode "Brian Griffin's House of Payne").
 January 30: Ron Holsey, American television writer (Johnny Test, Curious George, Martha Speaks, My Friends Tigger & Pooh, Arthur, Winx Club, Miles from Tomorrowland, Hanazuki: Full of Treasures, Elena of Avalor, Rusty Rivets, Nina's World, Pinkalicious & Peterrific, If You Give a Mouse a Cookie, The Stinky & Dirty Show, T.O.T.S., Nella the Princess Knight, Sesame Street).
 January 31: Justin Timberlake, American musician and actor (voice of Arthur Pendragon in Shrek the Third, Boo-Boo Bear in Yogi Bear, Branch in the Trolls franchise, himself in The Simpsons episode "New Kids on the Blecch").

February
 February 1: John Gemberling, American actor and comedian (voice of Doofus Drake in DuckTales, Blastus in Robotomy, Tyler in Big Mouth, Russell in The Great North).
 February 8: Dawn Olivieri, American actress (voice of Pepper Potts in The Avengers: Earth's Mightiest Heroes).
 February 9: Tom Hiddleston, English actor (voice of Captain Hook in The Pirate Fairy, Lord Nooth in Early Man, Loki in What If...? and The Simpsons shorts "The Good, the Bart, and the Loki" and "Welcome to the Club", Seuss Narrator and Killer Robot #1 in the Robot Chicken episode "Butchered in Burbank", Statue Griffin in the Family Guy episode "No Country Club for Old Men", Kanjigar in the Trollhunters: Tales of Arcadia episode "Becoming: Part 1").
 February 10:
 Stephanie Beatriz, American actress (voice of Mirabel Madrigal in Encanto, Gosalyn Waddlemeyer in DuckTales, General Sweet Mayhem in The Lego Movie 2: The Second Part, Kate Kane in Catwoman: Hunted, Gertie in Ice Age: Collision Course).
 Uzo Aduba, American actress (voice of Bismuth in Steven Universe, Queen Novo in My Little Pony: The Movie, Alicia Hawthorne in Lightyear, Colonel Kubritz in 3Below: Tales of Arcadia).
 February 12: Lisa Hannigan, Irish musician (voice of Blue Diamond in the Steven Universe franchise, Bronagh in Song of the Sea).
 February 17: Joseph Gordon-Levitt, American actor and filmmaker (voice of Jim Hawkins in Treasure Planet, Jiro Horikoshi in The Wind Rises, Jiminy Cricket in Pinocchio).
 February 23: Josh Gad, American actor (voice of Olaf in the Frozen franchise and the Sofia the First episode "The Secret Library: Olaf and the Tale of Miss Nettle", Chuck in The Angry Birds Movie and The Angry Birds Movie 2, Louis in Ice Age: Continental Drift, Mondo in Good Vibes, Birdie in Central Park, Art in the American Dad! episode "Pulling Double Booty", LT-319 in the Star Wars Rebels episode "Double Agent Droid").

March
 March 2: Danielle Mone Truitt, American actress (voice of Georgia in The Princess and the Frog).
 March 8: Justin Wright, American animator (Pixar), (d. 2008).

April
 April 11: Matt Ryan, Welsh actor (voice of John Constantine in the DC Animated Movie Universe, Constantine: City of Demons, and the Harley Quinn episode "It's a Swamp Thing").

May
 May 11: JP Karliak, American actor and comedian (voice of Kouzou Fuyutsuki in the Netflix dub of Neon Genesis Evangelion, Ted Templeton in The Boss Baby: Back in Business, Tin Man in Dorothy and the Wizard of Oz, Wile E. Coyote in New Looney Tunes, Dante Crescendo in Trolls: TrollsTopia, Green Goblin in Spidey and His Amazing Friends, Reese in Batman: The Killing Joke, Willy Wonka in Tom and Jerry: Willy Wonka and the Chocolate Factory, Linus in The Stinky & Dirty Show, Doc Samson in the Hulk and the Agents of S.M.A.S.H. episode "The Skaar Whisperer").
 May 19: Jonas Poher Rasmussen, Danish filmmaker (Flee).
 May 28: Laura Bailey, American voice actress (voice of Tohru Honda in Fruits Basket, Lust in Fullmetal Alchemist, young Trunks in Dragon Ball Z, the title character in Crayon Shin-chan, Keiko Yulimara in Yu Yu Hakasho, Sana Kurata in Kodacha, Ayaka Yukihiro and Evangeline A.K. McDowell in Negima!, Maka Albarn in Soul Eater, Emily / Glitter Lucky in Glitter Force, Firestar in The Super Hero Squad Show, Gamora in Avengers Assemble, Black Widow in Avengers Assemble and Ultimate Spider-Man, Gwen Stacy in Spider-Man).

June
 June 1: Johnny Pemberton, American actor (voice of Peanut in Pickle and Peanut, Dr. Eigerman in the Bob's Burgers episode "The Kids Run the Restaurant", Braco in the Adventure Time episode "The Suitor").
 June 4: T.J. Miller, American actor and comedian (voice of Fred in Big Hero 6, Tuffnut Thorston in the How to Train Your Dragon franchise, Gene in The Emoji Movie, Robbie Valentino in Gravity Falls).
 June 8: Ai Nonaka, Japanese actress (voice of Beauty in Bobobo-bo Bo-bobo, Kyoko Sakura in Puella Magi Madoka Magica, Japanese dub voice of Connie Maheswaran in Steven Universe).
 June 13: Chris Evans, American actor (voice of Buzz Lightyear in Lightyear, Casey Jones in TMNT, Stewart Stanton in Battle for Terra, Human Torch, Gobo Fraggle, Teacher and Pilot in Robot Chicken).
 June 22: Monty Oum, American animator, animation director and actor (Rooster Teeth, Red vs. Blue), (d. 2015).
 June 30: Matt Danner, American animator (Spümcø), storyboard artist (The Ripping Friends, Warner Bros. Animation, Gravity Falls, Wander Over Yonder), character designer (Xiaolin Showdown, Johnny Test), background artist (Gravity Falls), sheet timer (Coconut Fred's Fruit Salad Island), director (Xiaolin Showdown, The Drinky Crow Show, Dan Vs., The Looney Tunes Show, Team Hot Wheels), producer (Legend of the Three Caballeros, Muppet Babies) and voice actor (voice of various characters in Legend of the Three Caballeros, Kermit the Frog, Beaker, Waldolf, Rowlf the Dog and Swedish Chef in Muppet Babies).

August
 August 1: Ashley Parker Angel, American musician, actor and member of O-Town (voice of Danny Star in Handy Manny, himself in the Clone High episode "Plane Crazy: Gate Expectations").
 August 3: Travis Willingham, American actor (voice of Roy Mustang in Fullmetal Alchemist, Knuckles the Echidna in the Sonic the Hedgehog franchise, Portgas D. Ace in the Funimation dub of One Piece, Thor in Ultimate Spider-Man, Avengers Assemble, Hulk and the Agents of S.M.A.S.H., Guardians of the Galaxy, and Spider-Man, Hulk and Human Torch in The Super Hero Squad Show, King Roland in Sofia the First, Tim Buktu, Kraab, Sydney, and Cannonbolt in Ben 10, Zartan in Billy Dilley's Super-Duper Subterranean Summer, Grog Strongjaw in The Legend of Vox Machina).

September
 September 4: Beyoncé Knowles, American musician and actress (voice of Shine in Wow! Wow! Wubbzy!: Wubb Idol, Queen Tara in Epic, Nala in The Lion King).
 September 7: Athena Karkanis, Canadian actress (voice of Aviva Corcovado in Wild Kratts, Opaline in My Little Pony: Make Your Mark).
 September 8: Jonathan Taylor Thomas, American actor and director (voice of young Simba in The Lion King, the title character in The Adventures of Pinocchio, Shoukichi in Pom Poko, Tangie in The Tangerine Bear, Spot in The Adventures of Spot, Scarecrow Jr. in The Oz Kids, Tyler Tucker in The Wild Thornberrys, George in Itsy Bitsy Spider, Luke Stetson in The Simpsons episode "Dude, Where's My Ranch?").
 September 15: Ben Schwartz, American actor (voice of the title characters in Randy Cunningham: 9th Grade Ninja and Sonic the Hedgehog, Dewey in DuckTales, Leonardo in Rise of the Teenage Mutant Ninja Turtles, Lou in MODOK).
 September 22: Ashley Eckstein, American actress (voice of Ahsoka Tano in the Star Wars franchise, Mia in Sofia the First, Dagger and Shriek in Ultimate Spider-Man, Lady Elanna in Avengers Assemble, Yaeko Okajima in Only Yesterday, Tallstar in the She-Ra and the Princesses of Power episode "Stranded", Bailey in The Replacements episode "Glee by the Sea").
September 29: 
Kelly McCreary, American actress (voice of Dot in Harvey Girls Forever!).
Scott McAfee, American actor (voice of Willie Watt in Batman Beyond, Louis in the Freakazoid! episode "Fatman and Boy Blubber", first voice of Littlefoot in The Land Before Time franchise).

October
 October 31: Ali Kazmi, Pakistani-Canadian actor, director and producer (voice of Cousin, Fruit Seller and Market Voices in The Breadwinner).

November
 November 1: Matt Jones, American actor (voice of Drip in Planes: Fire & Rescue, Kyle in Home and Home: Adventures with Tip & Oh, Gunther Magnuson in Kick Buttowski: Suburban Daredevil, Lenz in Tron: Uprising, Humpty Dumpty in Beware the Batman, Hector Flanagan in Sanjay and Craig, Pig in Pig Goat Banana Cricket, Percy in Amphibia, Dave Grant-Gomez in Hamster & Gretel, Zack in the Wallykazam! episode "Dawn of the Zucchini").
 November 16: Caitlin Glass, American actress (voice of Winry Rockbell in Fullmetal Alchemist, Haruhi Fujioka in Ouran High School Host Club, Nefertari Vivi in One Piece, Evergreen in Fairy Tail, Mina Ashido in My Hero Academia, Vados in Dragon Ball Super, Petra Rall in Attack on Titan, Hitomi Kanzaki in The Vision of Escaflowne, Maki Nishikino in Love Live! School Idol Project, Saki Nikaido in Zombie Land Saga, Damian Desmond in Spy × Family).
 November 23: John Lavelle, American actor and playwright (voice of Mouse Foreman in Zootopia, Puck, Liam and Janitor Bob in Kipo and the Age of Wonderbeasts, Peekablue in the She-Ra and the Princesses of Power episode "Perils of Peekablue", additional voices in Frozen and Ralph Breaks the Internet).

December
 December 1: Annemarie Brown, American animator (King of the Hill) and storyboard artist (Family Guy).
 December 2: Britney Spears, American singer, songwriter and dancer (voice of Donner in Hooves of Fire and Robbie the Reindeer in Legend of the Lost Tribe, herself in The Simpsons episode "The Mansion Family").
 December 14: Matthew A. Cherry, American former American football player, film director, writer and producer (Hair Love).
 December 16: Krysten Ritter, American actress and model (voice of Dana Polk in the Robot Chicken episode "Immortal", Gina in The Cleveland Show episode "California Dreamin (All The Cleves are Brown)", Shelia Redfield in The Simpsons episode "Meat Is Murder").
 December 25: Ant Blades, English cartoonist and animator (creator of It's Pony).

Specific date unknown
 Jan Rogowski, British technical director and producer (co-founder of Red Star 3D), (d. 2022).
 Hyun Min Lee, Korean-American animator (Christmas Is Here Again, The Mr. Men Show, Walt Disney Animation Studios, Amphibia).
 Michał Socha, Polish animator and filmmaker (Chick, Loop, Room, animated the couch gags for The Simpsons episodes "Orange Is the New Yellow" and "The Incredible Lightness of Being a Baby").

Deaths

January
 January 18: Manuel Perez, Mexican-American animator and director (Warner Bros. Cartoons, Bill Melendez Productions, DePatie-Freleng, Hanna-Barbera, Fritz the Cat), dies at age 66.

February
 February 12: Lev Atamanov, Armenian-Russian animator and film director (The Scarlet Flower, The Snow Queen, The Key), dies at age 75.
 February 20: Bernard B. Brown, American sound engineer and composer (Warner Bros. Cartoons), dies at age 82.
 February 22: Michael Maltese, American screenwriter (Warner Bros. Cartoons, Hanna-Barbera) and comics writer, dies at age 73 from cancer.

March
 March 16: Bill Baucom, American actor (voice of Trusty in Lady and the Tramp), dies at age 70.
 March 26: Hal Adelquist, American animator, animation producer and storyboard writer (Walt Disney Company), dies at age 66.
 Specific date unknown: Richard Loederer, American comics writer, comics artist and animation art director (worked for Amedee J. Van Beuren), dies at age 86 or 87.

April
 April 16: Bernice Hansen, American actress (voice of Tillie Tiger in Elmer Elephant, Petunia Pig and Cookie in the Looney Tunes franchise, Little Kitty in 1930s Warner Bros. shorts, continued voice of Oswald the Lucky Rabbit and Andy Panda), dies at age 83.
 April 23: Vivie Risto, American animator and comics artist (Walt Disney Company), dies at age 78.
 April 24: Howard Purcell, American comics artist, writer and animator, dies at age 62.

June
 June 4: Ray Abrams, American animator and director (Walt Disney Company, MGM Studios, Walter Lantz, Hanna-Barbera), dies at age 75.
 June 19: Lotte Reiniger, German film director and animator (The Adventures of Prince Achmed), dies at age 82.
 June 21: Don Figlozzi, American animator and cartoonist (Fleischer Studios), dies at age 72.

July
 July 3: Ross Martin, American actor (voice of Punchy for Hawaiian Punch, Andy Svenson in The Man from Button Willow, Dr. Paul Williams in Sealab 2020, Agent 000 in The Robonic Stooges), dies at age 61.
 July 4: Stephen Bosustow, Canadian-American animator (Ub Iwerks, Walter Lantz Productions, Walt Disney Animation Studios) and film producer (UPA, Gerald McBoing Boing, Mr. Magoo, Bosustow Entertainment, Sesame Street), dies at age 69.

October
 October 3: Claire Parker, American engineer (inventor of the Pinscreen) and animator, dies at age 75. 
 October 15: Frank de Kova, American actor (voice of Angie in Heavy Traffic, Managan in Coonskin and Old Vinnie in Hey Good Lookin'), dies at age 71.
 October 22: Little Ann Little, American singer and actress (continued voice of Betty Boop), dies at age 71.

November
 November 12: Ralph Heimdahl, American animator and comics artist (Walt Disney Company, made comics based on Bugs Bunny), dies at age 72.
 November 25: Jack Albertson, American actor, comedian and singer (voice of Amos Slade in The Fox and the Hound), dies at age 74.

December
 December 27: Hoagy Carmichael, American musician, composer, songwriter, actor and lawyer (voiced himself in The Flintstones episode "The Hit Song Writers"), dies at age 82.

Specific date unknown
 William Sturm, American animator (Fleischer Brothers), dies at age 74 or 75.

See also
 1981 in anime

References

External links
Animated works of the year, listed in the IMDb